Liu Jin (28 February 1451 – 25 August 1510) was a powerful Ming dynasty Chinese eunuch during the reign of the Zhengde Emperor. 

Liu was famous for being one of the most influential officials in Chinese history. For some time, Liu was the emperor in all but name. He was the leader of the "Eight Tigers", a powerful group of eunuchs who controlled the imperial court. Liu was from the area of Xingping, a county in Shaanxi province, approximately 30 miles west of Xi'an prefecture. 

Liu Jin's original surname was Tan. When he became a eunuch under the aegis of a eunuch official named Liu, he changed his surname to Liu.

Plotting against the emperor
The Zhengde Emperor's dissolute lifestyle placed a heavy burden on the people of the empire. He would refuse to receive all his ministers and ignored all their petitions whilst sanctioning the growth of the eunuch community in the imperial palace. Liu made some reforms such as encouraging widows to remarry, a move which went against the Neo-Confucianism views of the time. Many officials and other eunuchs opposed Liu – the Prince of Anhua rebellion of Zhu Zhifan was a failed attempt to assassinate Liu and seize power. After officials suppressed the uprising, an official named Yang Yiqing persuaded another eunuch Zhang Yong to report Liu's plotting of rebellion. The Zhengde Emperor did not believe this report at first but took it seriously enough to consider expelling Liu to Fengyang County in Anhui Province. Zhang's discovery of many weapons in Liu's houses sealed his fate.

Death
The emperor ordered Liu executed in Beijing by death by a thousand cuts over a period of three days, a process that resulted in Liu being cut 3,357 times. According to witnesses, angry onlookers bought a piece of his flesh for one qian (the smallest available currency at the time) and consumed it accompanied with rice wine. Liu died on the second day of his punishment after three to four hundred cuts.

Personal wealth
According to one report, shortly before Liu was executed, 12,057,800 taels (449,750 kg) of gold and 259,583,600 taels (9,682,470 kg) of silver were taken from his residence.<ref>(In Chinese) [http://www.xycq.net/forum/archiver/tid-130490.html Discussion of the origins of Qing Dynasty ministerial corruption (谈谈中国清朝腐败的深层次原因)] </ref> In 2001, the Asian Wall Street Journal placed Liu on its list of the fifty wealthiest persons in the past 1,000 years although the actual amount may in fact have been lower.

References

Further readingThe Cambridge History of China, Vol. 7: The Ming Dynasty, 1368–1644Frederick W. Mote & Denis Twitchett The Prince of Anhua Uprising''

Ming dynasty eunuchs
1510 deaths
Executed Ming dynasty people
16th-century executions by China
Year of birth unknown
Politicians from Xianyang
Ming dynasty politicians
People executed by flaying
Executed people from Shaanxi
Cannibalised people
1451 births